Melhania milleri is a species of flowering plant in the family Malvaceae. It is found only in Socotra. Its natural habitats are subtropical or tropical dry forests and subtropical or tropical dry shrubland.

References

Melhania
Endemic flora of Socotra
Data deficient plants
Taxonomy articles created by Polbot